The 1953 Yenice–Gönen earthquake occurred at 21:06 local time (19:06 UTC on 18 March in the province of Çanakkale and Balıkesir in the Marmara Region at western Turkey. It had a surface wave magnitude of 7.5 and a maximum felt intensity of IX (Violent) on the Mercalli intensity scale. It caused widespread damage, killing 1,070 and causing damage that was estimated at US$3,570,000 repair value.

Tectonic setting
The tectonics of northern and eastern Turkey are dominated by the two strike-slip fault zones that accommodate the west to southwestward movement of the Anatolian Plate relative to the Eurasian Plate and the Arabian Plate as it is effectively being squeezed out by convergence between them. The quake occurred along the Yenice–Gönen Fault, which is a southern extension of the North Anatolian Fault Zone.

Damage and casualties
The quake had a surface wave magnitude of 7.5 and it killed at least 1,070; 998 of those deaths were in Yenice, with another 50 in Gönen, 20 in Çan, and 3 in Manyas. The cost of repair was estimated at US$3,570,000. Several thousand buildings were affected in the Can-Yenice-Gonen area. Damage of intensity VI occurred at Sakarya (Adapazari), Bursa, Edirne, Istanbul and Izmir. The quake was felt throughout the Aegean Islands and in much of mainland Greece, with damage occurring as far away as Crete. Shaking was also recorded in Bulgaria.

Although officials predicted the earthquake would cause only 265 deaths, it multiplied with a death toll seven times the number as expected.

Characteristics

Aftermath
The damage caused by this earthquake led to a new national reconstruction law in Turkey. In Greece the damage was severe enough that new building codes were introduced.

Future seismic hazard
Trenching and other fieldwork along the trace of the Yenice–Gönen Fault has identified three earthquakes before the 1953 event, about 1440 AD, between 620 and 1270 AD, and another event of uncertain age. These past events give a mean recurrence interval for large earthquakes of 660±160 years. This indicates that there is no significant current threat from ruptures along this fault zone.

See also 
List of earthquakes in 1953
List of earthquakes in Turkey

Notes

Further reading

External links

1953 Yenice
1953 earthquakes
1953 in Turkey
History of Çanakkale Province
History of Balıkesir Province
March 1953 events in Europe
1953 disasters in Turkey